Kazakhstan competed at the 2011 World Aquatics Championships in Shanghai, China between July 16 and 31, 2011.

Open water swimming

Men

Swimming

Kazakhstan qualified 2 swimmers.

Men

Women

Synchronised swimming

Kazakhstan has qualified 12 athletes in synchronised swimming.

Women

Reserves
Anastassiya Sholkova
Kristina Tynybayeva

Water polo

Men

Team Roster 

Alexandr Shvedov
Sergey Gubarev
Murat Shakenov
Roman Pilipenko
Alexey Panfili
Alexandr Fenochko
Alexandr Axenov
Rustam Ukumanov
Evgeniy Zhilyayev – Captain
Mikhail Ruday
Ravil Manafov
Nikita Kokorin
Alexey Demchenko

Group A

Classification 13–16

Thirteenth place game

Women

Team Roster

Galina Rytova
Lyudmila Chegodayeva
Aizhan Akilbayeva
Anna Turova
Kamila Zakirova
Kamila Marina
Natalya Alexandrova
Darya Vassilyeva
Agata Tnasheva
Marina Gritsenko
Yelena Chebotova
Assem Mussarova
Yelena Starodubtseva

Group A

Classification 13–16

Thirteenth place game

References

2011 in Kazakhstani sport
Nations at the 2011 World Aquatics Championships
Kazakhstan at the World Aquatics Championships